DeSoto Bridge was a trussed deck-arch bridge that spanned the Mississippi River in St. Cloud, Minnesota. It was built in 1958 by the Minnesota Department of Transportation.  The bridge was painted black, which is typical for railroad bridges but unusual for a highway bridge.  The river banks on either side are relatively high, so the bridge required deep trusses which arched over the river.

After the collapse of the I-35W Mississippi River bridge in Minneapolis on August 1, 2007, Minnesota Governor Tim Pawlenty ordered the DeSoto Bridge and two other bridges in Minnesota to be inspected. The three bridges have a design similar to that of the former I-35W bridge.

The bridge was inspected on August 3, 2007 and found to be structurally sound.  However, on March 20, 2008, four gusset plates were found to be bent.  The bridge was closed indefinitely as a precaution and demolished in October 2008.

After inspections by the Minnesota Department of Transportation and the National Transportation Safety Board, it was determined that the DeSoto Bridge should be replaced. The replacement project started in September 2008 and was originally projected to be completed by June 2010.  The new replacement bridge, named the Granite City Crossing, opened October 29, 2009.

See also
List of crossings of the Upper Mississippi River

References
General references
 
Cited references

External links
 Minnesota Department of Transportation - Hwy 23 Bridge in St. Cloud

Bridges completed in 1958
Bridges over the Mississippi River
Buildings and structures demolished in 2008
Buildings and structures in St. Cloud, Minnesota
Open-spandrel deck arch bridges in the United States
Demolished bridges in the United States
Former road bridges in Minnesota
Truss bridges in the United States
Metal bridges in the United States
1958 establishments in Minnesota
2008 disestablishments in Minnesota